Heliciopsis rufidula is a species of plant in the family Proteaceae. It is a tree found in Peninsular Malaysia and Borneo. It is threatened by habitat loss.

References

rufidula
Trees of Peninsular Malaysia
Trees of Borneo
Vulnerable plants
Taxonomy articles created by Polbot